This is a list of cities and towns in Suriname:

Abenaston
Albina
Alfonsdorp
Alliance
Anapaike
Apetina 
Apoera
Aurora 
Batavia
Benzdorp
Berg en Dal
Berlijn
Bitagron
Boskamp
Boslanti
Botopasi
Brokopondo
Brownsweg
Cabendadorp
Cassipora
Corneliskondre
Cottica
Djumu
Donderskamp
Friendship
Goddo
Groningen
Hollandse Kamp
Jenny
Kalebaskreek
Kasuela (disputed)
Kajana
Koewarasan
Kwakoegron
Kwamalasamutu
Lelydorp
Lebidoti
Manlobi
Mary's Hope
Matta
Moengo
Mora kondre
Nason
Nieuw Amsterdam
Nieuw Jacobkondre
Nieuw Nickerie
Onverdacht
Onverwacht
Paramaribo (Capital and largest city)
Paranam
Pelelu Tepu
Pikin Saron
Pokigron
Pontoetoe
Powakka
Redi Doti
Ricanau Mofo
Snesiekondre
Totness
Uitkijk
Villa Brazil
Wageningen
Wanhatti
Washabo
Witsanti
Zanderij

References

External links
Cities and districts of Suriname and population by census year

Suriname, List of cities in
Suriname
 
Towns